The Turkish Ski Federation (TKF) is the main governing body for skiing in Turkey. Founded in 1939, it covers the skiing disciplines of alpine, cross-country, freestyle, Nordic combined, ski jumping, and snowboarding.

It is a member of the Turkish Olympic Committee and the International Ski Federation (FIS). Currently, the federation's president is Erol Mehmet Yarar.

External links
 Official site 

1939 establishments in Turkey
Organizations based in Ankara
Ski
National members of the International Ski Federation
Federation
Sports organizations established in 1939